Robert Coin (1901–1988) is a French sculptor and engraver, born in Saint-Quentin on 17 December 1901. He died in Lille on 12 February 1988.

Works

Basilique de Lisieux

Some of Coin's best known works are those which he executed at the Basilique de Lisieux. Lisieux is in Calvados in Basse-Normandie. In the pediment at the front of the Basilica is a tympanum with depictions of those who had contributed to the creation of the Basilica, ranged on either side of Coin's statue of St Therese herself. These people are from left to right: Monseignor Octave Germain, Mother Agnès de Jésus (1861-1951) Sister Pauline Martin, Sister Thérèse, the Prioress of Carmel, Cardinal Pacelli (1876-1958) the future Pope Pius XII, Monseigneur Picaud, the Bishop of Bayeux who became Pope Pius XI (1857-1939), Cardinal Suhard (1874-1949) Archbishop of Paris and Father Maurice-Marie-Louis Bellière (1874-1907) a missionary. Around these people are a soldier and some children. The inscriptions on the tympanum read:

A photograph of the tympanum is shown below and in the gallery are some of the carvings within the tympanum, all these photographs supplied courtesy Marc Dan.

Another of Coin's works in the Basilica was on the interior side of the main entrance. This is another tympanum depicting Jesus and the Apostles and the Virgin of Mount Carmel. The inscription reads-

A photograph can be seen in the gallery below, this also courtesy of Marc Don.
Another of Coin's works are the "Seven Virtues" on the lower gallery of the front of the Basilica. A photograph is shown below, again courtesy of Marc Don. In the centre Coin has depicted "Charity" with "Faith" on one side and "Hope" on the other. To the left of these three statues are "Justice" and "Prudence" and on the right "Strength" and "Moderation".

Other works

References

External links 
 Website of Lisieux
 French Wiki

French architectural sculptors
1901 births
1988 deaths
French male sculptors
20th-century French sculptors